Norwegian Prima is a Prima-class cruise ship operated by Norwegian Cruise Line (NCL). She is the first of six new ships in its class and entered service in August 2022.

References

External links 
 

Ships built in Trieste
Ships of Norwegian Cruise Line